Arnold Louis Wilson (19 April 1887 – 1 November 1970) was an Australian rules footballer who played with Richmond in the Victorian Football League (VFL).

Notes

External links 

1887 births
1970 deaths
Australian rules footballers from Victoria (Australia)
Richmond Football Club players